Shirebrook Academy (formerly Shirebrook School) is a coeducational secondary school with academy status, located in Shirebrook in the county of Derbyshire, and is part of the Aston Community Education Trust.

Previously a community school administered by Derbyshire County Council, the school converted to academy status in September 2010 and was renamed Shirebrook Academy. An official opening occurred in November, 2010 with Lord Winston, then Chancellor of Sheffield Hallam University, as guest speaker, lecturing a class about DNA and taking questions from the student council.

The school is sponsored by Sheffield Hallam University, but continues to coordinate with Derbyshire County Council for admissions.

Shirebrook Academy relocated into a new building on Common Lane in April 2013.

The building is shared with Stubbin Wood School, a special school for children ages 2 to 19 who have learning disabilities including those on the autistic spectrum, which moved in April 2013 from its previous location in Burlington Avenue, Langwith Junction, a part of Shirebrook. Prior to relocation where the newer facility is three times the size, the school had a full quota of 133, and had a waiting list. The Stubbin Wood Nursery is still based at Burlington Avenue.

In 2014 the school joined a consortium  with The Bolsover School, Heritage High School and Springwell Community College to form 'Aspire Sixth Form', a sixth form provision that operated across all the school sites. Aspire Sixth Form closed in 2016 due to low pupil numbers.

Principal Mark Cottingham took over from Julie Bloor in 2015.

Associate Principal Lindsey Burgin took over from Mark Cottingham in September 2022.

Shirebrook Academy offers GCSEs and BTECs as programmes of study for pupils.

Notable former pupils
 Mason Bennett, footballer

Shirebrook Grammar School
 Prof Margaret MacKeith CBE FRGS FRSA FRTPI, former Professor of Town Planning at the University of Central Lancashire, and Preston Polytechnic

References

External links
Shirebrook Academy official website
Stubbin Wood School official website

Secondary schools in Derbyshire
Academies in Derbyshire
Sheffield Hallam University
Shirebrook